Thomas Neal (born August 17, 1987) is a retired American professional baseball outfielder who is currently a hitting coach for the San Francisco Giants organization. He has played in Major League Baseball (MLB) for the Cleveland Indians, New York Yankees and Chicago Cubs.

Major League career

San Francisco Giants
Neal attended Poway High School in Poway, California, and Riverside Community College. The San Francisco Giants selected him in the 36th round of the 2005 Major League Baseball Draft.

On April 28, 2009, while playing for the San Jose Giants of the California League, Neal hit for the cycle in a 17–7 victory over the Lancaster JetHawks.

Cleveland Indians
Neal was traded to the Cleveland Indians on July 30, 2011 in exchange for Orlando Cabrera. He was optioned to the Triple-A Columbus Clippers.

Neal was designated for assignment on April 4, 2012, but was added to the Indians major league roster as a September call-up on September 1, 2012.

Neal was designated for assignment by the Indians on January 3, 2013 to make room for Nick Swisher on their roster. He was released by the Indians on January 12, 2013.

New York Yankees
The New York Yankees signed him to a minor-league contract later that month. The Yankees promoted Neal to the major leagues on June 14. He was sent back down to Triple-A on June 22. He was recalled again on July 20, sent back down on July 26, and designated for assignment August 2.

Chicago Cubs
Neal was claimed off waivers by the Chicago Cubs on August 5, 2013. He was outrighted off the roster on October 9, 2013.

Cincinnati Reds
He signed a minor league deal with the Cincinnati Reds in January 2014. He became a free agent after the 2014 season.

Somerset Patriots
Neal signed with the Somerset Patriots of the Atlantic League of Professional Baseball for the 2015 season.

Coaching career
He became a free agent and retired after the 2015 season and became a minor league hitting coach in the San Francisco Giants Organization.

References

External links

1987 births
Living people
Baseball players from Inglewood, California
Major League Baseball outfielders
Cleveland Indians players
New York Yankees players
Chicago Cubs players
Salem-Keizer Volcanoes players
Arizona League Giants players
Augusta GreenJackets players
Bravos de Margarita players
American expatriate baseball players in Venezuela
San Jose Giants players
Richmond Flying Squirrels players
Fresno Grizzlies players
Columbus Clippers players
Akron Aeros players
Scranton/Wilkes-Barre RailRiders players
Louisville Bats players
Scottsdale Scorpions players
Somerset Patriots players
Minor league baseball coaches